The Unbelievable Guitar and Voice of Jerry Reed is a studio album by Jerry Reed, released in 1967. It was the first of 33 albums Reed would record for RCA Victor.

The album is notable for introducing two songs, "Guitar Man" and "U.S. Male", that would soon after be covered by Elvis Presley, with Reed participating in the recording sessions.

Reissues
 In 2012, The Unbelievable Guitar and Voice of Jerry Reed and Nashville Underground were reissued on CD by Real Gone Music.

Track listing
All tracks composed by Jerry Reed Hubbard

Side one
 "It Don't Work That Way" – 2:15
 "Guitar Man" – 2:25
 "You're Young and You'll Forget" – 2:45
 "Woman Shy" – 2:13
 "I Feel for You" – 2:56
 "Take a Walk" – 2:31

Side two
 "Love Man" – 2:23
 "If I Promise" – 2:29
 "U.S. Male" – 2:25
 "Long Gone" – 2:26
 "If It Comes to That" – 2:18
 "The Claw" - 1:56

Personnel
Jerry Reed - vocals, lead guitar
Wayne Moss - guitar
Fred Carter - guitar
Junior Huskey - bass
Jerry Carrigan - drums
Jerry Smith -  harpsichord
Ray Stevens - harpsichord

Production notes
Produced by Chet Atkins
Recording Engineers - Jim Malloy and William Vandervort
Recorded in RCA Victor's Nashville Sound Studio, Nashville, Tennessee
Liner notes by Merle Atkins

References
The Unbelievable Guitar and Voice of Jerry Reed on Jerry Reed.nl

Albums produced by Chet Atkins
1967 albums
Jerry Reed albums
RCA Victor albums